I Am a Singer (season 4), is the fourth season of the Chinese version of the South Korean reality show I Am a Singer. The show was broadcast on Hunan Television in 2016. Due to the sudden banning of Korean entertainment in China in November 2016, this was currently the last season to feature Korean singers in the competition. It was also the last season to use the I Am a Singer title, before renaming to Singer with effect from the next season.

The season premiered on January 15, 2016, and concluded on April 15, 2016. On the finals aired April 8, 2016, Hong Kong-American singer Coco Lee was the winner of the season, becoming the first non-mainland Chinese national to win the show. Jeff Chang came in second, and Korean singer Hwang Chi-yeul finished third place.

Competition format
Most of the competition followed the same format as the previous series, including the Challenge rounds debuted in the last season. Like the previous seasons, the votes counted from both the Qualifier and Knockout rounds determined which singer was eliminated for the night. The Challenge round which introduced in the previous season also return, with an added rule where singers had to rank in the top four (4th place or better) to remain in the competition.

I Am a Singer- Who Will Challenge
An online Spin-off of the show, I Am a Singer- Who Will Challenge (我是歌手—誰來踢館) was aired daily from December 5, 2015, until the finale on January 23, 2016, on the online site of Mango TV, for a total of 50 days.

The site featured each contestant having their own Challenge page, where online viewers were able recommend the singers in participating the competition. When a singer's recommendation hit at least 18,000 views, they were eligible to participate in a daily live show aired between December 5, 2015, until January 7, 2016. During each episode's broadcast, viewers could distribute their 100 "Decibel points" to the singers they liked the most on each show.

The top eight singers accumulating the most 'Decibel points' after January 7 moved on to the Sing-off. During each night's broadcast until January 15, two random singers had to sing one song each, with a total of three songs throughout the eight shows. 10,000 viewers were be chosen at random. These viewers distributed their 100 "Decibel points" to determine the contestants placement in the sing-off as well as in the finale. The second week's shows that aired from January 16 until January 22 featured the singer's daily lives and their preparations up to the finale.

The finale aired January 23 and showcased the eight singers for the last time, each singing two songs (one chosen song and one hit song from previous seasons). In each round, 10,000 "Decibel points were distributed to random viewers eligible to cast their votes for the winner (viewers had to vote for three singers to be counted as a valid vote). The singer accumulating the most votes after two songs would win the right to take part in the competition as a Challenger on the third Challenge round.

Korean singer Kim Ji-Mun was named as the winner of I Am a Singer- Who Will Challenge.

Tiebreaker
A tiebreaker can occur when multiple singers were tied with the lowest votes cast during an elimination round. The tie is resolved based on the placements in the next round, and the singer receiving a lower placement (regardless of the placements from other singers) was eliminated. Any eliminations (if applicable) in the following round would conduct as normal.

Contestants
The following singers participated in the fourth season are listed in alphabetical order (singers without a placement for the final is listed as finalist and singers withdrew were listed as withdrawn):

Key:
 – Winner
 – Runner-up
 – Third place
 – Other finalist

Future appearances
Coco Lee later returned as a guest performer on the fifth and sixth seasons. Kim Ji Mun later appeared on the seventh season as a guest performer for Yang Kun. Lala Hsu returned to compete for a second time on the eighth season.

Results

{| class="wikitable" style="text-align:center; font-size:85%"
|+
|-
! rowspan="4" width="30" | !! rowspan="4" width="250" class="unsortable" |Singer !! colspan="14" | Broadcast date (2016)
|-
! width="30"|Jan 15 !! width="30" |Jan 22
!! width="30" |Jan 29!! width="30"|Feb 5 !! width="30" |Feb 12
!! width="30"|Feb 19 !! width="30" |Feb 26 !! width="30" |Mar 4 
!! width="30" |Mar 11 !! width="30"|Mar 18 !! width="30" |Mar 25
!! width="30"|Apr 1 !!  colspan="2" width="30"|Apr 8
|-
! colspan="3" |1st round
! colspan="3" |2nd round
! colspan="3" |3rd round
! colspan="2" |4th round
! rowspan="2" |Breakout
! colspan="2" |Final round
|-
! width="70" data-sort-type="text" |Qualifying !! width="70" data-sort-type="text" |Knockout !! width="70" data-sort-type="text|Challenge !! width="70" data-sort-type="text"|Qualifying !! width="70" data-sort-type="text" |Knockout !! width="70" data-sort-type="text|Challenge !! width="70" data-sort-type="text"|Qualifying !! width="70" data-sort-type="text" |Knockout !! width="70" data-sort-type="text|Challenge !! width="70" data-sort-type="text"|Qualifying !! width="70" data-sort-type="text" |Knockout !! width="70" data-sort-type="text|1st round !! width="70" |2nd round 
|-
| 1
| Coco Lee
| style="background: pink;"| 6
| style="background: blue; color: white"| 1
| style="background: pink;"| 2
| style="background: pink;"| 4
| style="background: blue; color: white"| 1
| style="background: pink;"| 4
| style="background: blue; color: white"| 1
| style="background: red; color: white"| 7
| style="background: pink;"| 2
| style="background: pink;"| 5
| style="background: pink;"| 2
| style="background: pink;"| —
| style="background: blue; color: white"| 1
| style="background: lime;"| 1 
|-
| 2
| Jeff Chang
| —
| —
| —
| style="background: pink;"| 2
| style="background: pink;"| 5
| style="background: pink;"| 5
| style="background: pink;"| 6
| style="background: pink;"| 2
| style="background: blue; color: white"| 1
| style="background: pink;"| 4
| style="background: pink;"| 6
| style="background:#C697F3;"| 1
| style="background: pink;"| 3
| style="background: yellow;"| 2 
|-
| 3
| Hwang Chi Yeul
| style="background: pink;"| 2
| style="background: pink;"| 2
| style="background: pink;"| 3
| style="background: blue; color: white"| 1
| style="background: pink;"| 6
| style="background: pink;"| 3
| style="background: pink;"| 4
| style="background: blue; color: white"| 1
| style="background: pink;"| 4
| style="background: blue; color: white"| 1
| style="background: pink;"| 4
| style="background: pink;"| —
| style="background: pink;"| 2
| style="background: yellow;"| 3 
|-
| =4
| Hacken Lee
| style="background: pink;"| 3
| style="background: pink;"| 5
| style="background: blue; color: white"| 1
| style="background: pink;"| 5
| style="background: pink;"| 3
| style="background: pink;"| 2
| style="background: pink;"| 5
| style="background: pink;"| 6
| style="background: pink;"| 5
| style="background: pink;"| 2
| style="background: blue; color: white"| 1
| style="background: pink;"| —
| style="background: pink;"| 5
| style="background: yellow;"| —
|-
| =4
| LaLa Hsu
| style="background: blue; color: white"| 1
| style="background: pink;"| 6
| style="background: pink;"| 4
| style="background: pink;"| 3
| style="background: pink;"| 2
| style="background: pink;"| 6
| style="background: pink;"| 2
| style="background: pink;"| 4
| style="background: red; color: white"| 7
| style="background: pink;"| 3
| style="background: pink;"| 5
| style="background: pink;"| —
| style="background: pink;"| 6
| style="background: yellow;"| —
|-
| =4
| Lao Lang
| —
| —
| —
| —
| —
| —
| —
| —
| —
| style="background: pink;"| 6
| style="background: grey; color: white"| 7
| style="background:#C697F3;"| 3
| style="background: pink;"| 4
| style="background: yellow;"| — 
|-
| 7
| Joey Yung
| —
| —
| —
| —
| —
| —
| style="background: pink;"| 3
| style="background: pink;"| 5
| style="background: pink;"| 3
| style="background: red; color: white"| 7 
| style="background: pink;"| 3
| style="background:#C697F3;"| 2
| style="background: grey; color: white"| 7
| style="background:#F89B40;"| —
|-
| =8
| style="background:#92D3DA;color: black"| Elvis Wang
| —
| —
| —
| —
| —
| style="background:#994299; color: white"| 1
| style="background: red; color: white"| 7
| style="background: grey; color: white"| 3
| style="background:#F89B40;" | —
| style="background: grey; color: white"| —
| style="background: grey; color: white"| —
| style="background:#7FFFD4;"|4
| style="background: grey; color: white"| —
| style="background: grey; color: white"| —
|-
| =8
| Chao Chuan
| style="background: pink;"| 5
| style="background: pink;"| 3
| style="background: pink;"| 6
| style="background: red;color: white"| 7
| style="background: grey; color: white"| 7
| style="background:#F89B40;" | —
| style="background: grey; color: white"| —
| style="background: grey; color: white"| —
| style="background: grey; color: white"| —
| style="background: grey; color: white"| —
| style="background: grey; color: white"| —
| style="background:#7FFFD4;"| 5
| style="background: grey; color: white"| —
| style="background: grey; color: white"| —
|-
| =8
| Shin
| style="background: pink;"| 4
| style="background: pink;"| 7
| style="background: red; color: white"| 7
| style="background: pink;"| 6
| style="background: pink;"| 4
| style="background: grey; color: white"| 7
| style="background:#F89B40;" | —
| style="background: grey; color: white"| —
| style="background: grey; color: white"| —
| style="background: grey; color: white"| —
| style="background: grey; color: white"| —
| style="background:#7FFFD4;"| 6
| style="background: grey; color: white"| —
| style="background: grey; color: white"| —
|-
| =8
| style="background:#AFDFE4;color: black"| Kim Ji Mun
| —
| —
| —
| —
| —
| —
| —
| —
| style="background: tan;"| 6
| style="background:#F89B40;"| —
| style="background: grey; color: white"| —
| style="background:#7FFFD4;"| 7
| style="background: grey; color: white"| —
| style="background: grey; color: white"| —
|-
| =8
| style="background:#AFDFE4;color: black"| Su Yunying
| —
| —
| style="background: tan;"| 5
| style="background:#F89B40;"| —
| style="background: grey; color: white"| —
| style="background: grey; color: white"| —
| style="background: grey; color: white"| —
| style="background: grey; color: white"| —
| style="background: grey; color: white"| —
| style="background: grey; color: white"| —
| style="background: grey; color: white"| —
| style="background:#7FFFD4;"|8
| style="background: grey; color: white"| —
| style="background: grey; color: white"| —
|-
| =8
| HAYA Band
| style="background: red; color: white"| 7
| style="background: grey; color: white"| 4
| style="background:#F89B40; color: black"| —
| style="background: grey; color: white"| —
| style="background: grey; color: white"| —
| style="background: grey; color: white"| —
| style="background: grey; color: white"| —
| style="background: grey; color: white"| —
| style="background: grey; color: white"| —
| style="background: grey; color: white"| —
| style="background: grey; color: white"| —
| style="background:#7FFFD4;"| 9
| style="background: grey; color: white"| —
| style="background: grey; color: white"| —
|-
| =8
| Guan Zhe
| style="background: red; color: white"|  7
| style="background: grey; color: white"| 8
| style="background:#F89B40;" | —
| style="background: grey; color: white"| —
| style="background: grey; color: white"| —
| style="background: grey; color: white"| —
| style="background: grey; color: white"| —
| style="background: grey; color: white"| —
| style="background: grey; color: white"| —
| style="background: grey; color: white"| —
| style="background: grey; color: white"| —
| style="background:#7FFFD4;"| 10
| style="background: grey; color: white"| —
| style="background: grey; color: white"| —
|-
|}

Competition details

1st round

Qualifying (scramble tournament)
Taping Date: January 7, 2016
Airdate: January 15, 2016
For the first time in the show's history, as there were eight first round singers instead of seven, this round featured elimination. The singer receiving the lowest number of votes would be immediately eliminated; however, no one was eliminated as the bottom two singers were tied for 7th.

Knockout
Taping Date: January 14, 2016
Airdate: January 21, 2016
The round features its first-ever (and the series' only) tiebreaker of the series; between the two singers (HAYA band and Zhe) who tied for 7th on the last round, the one with the lower vote would be eliminated regardless of the overall placement. Eliminations for the round went ahead as normal; of the remaining seven singers, the singer with the lowest combined votes will also be eliminated.

Overall ranking
Guan Zhe was eliminated for losing the tie-breaker while HAYA Band was eliminated for receiving a lower count of overall votes; ironically, the two eliminated singers coincidentally received the bottom two count of overall votes.

 A. Coco Lee received 389 votes this round.
 B. Four votes less than 4th.
 C. Six votes less than 4th.

Challenge
Taping Date: January 21, 2016
Airdate: January 29, 2016
Su Yunying was the first challenger of the season; Shin would have been eliminated for finishing last, however, Su was unsuccessful in her challenge (placed 5th) and she was eliminated instead. Chuan was originally going to perform "白天不懂夜的黑" this week, but later changed to "Hotel California" as Chuan decided to pay tribute to the late-Eagles founder and lead singer Glenn Frey, who died the day before taping.

 A. Hacken Lee received 354 votes this round (25.50%).

2nd round

Qualifying
Taping Date: January 27, 2016
Airdate: February 5, 2016 
Jeff Chang was the first substitute singer of the season.

Knockout
Taping Date: February 3, 2016
Airdate: February 12, 2016

Overall ranking

 A. Coco Lee received 348 votes this round.

Challenge
Taping Date: February 10, 2016
Airdate: February 19, 2016
Elvis Wang was the second challenger of the season.

3rd round

Qualifying
Taping Date: February 17, 2016
Airdate: February 26, 2016   
Joey Yung was the second substitute singer of the season. During the episode, Yung was prompted to redo her recording twice after her radio equipment malfunctioned.

Knockout
Taping Date: February 25, 2016
Airdate: March 4, 2016
Chang and Coco were originally going to perform 2nd and 6th, respectively, but swapped by mutual agreement as Coco caught a bad cold.

Overall ranking

 A. One vote less than 3rd.

Challenge (Ultimate Challenge Round)
Taping Date: March 3, 2016
Airdate: March 11, 2016
Kim Ji-Mun won the I Am a Singer- Who Will Challenge online spin-off competition and became the third and final challenger of the season; LaLa Hsu was initially eliminated for finishing last, however, Kim was unsuccessful in his challenge (placed 6th) and was eliminated instead.

4th round

Qualifying (Ultimate Qualifying Round)
Taping Date: March 10, 2016
Airdate: March 18, 2016  
Lao Lang was the third and final substitute singer of the season. The order of performance for this episode was determined through swiping their smartphones, with the singer picking the first smartphone getting to perform first. After the performance, the backup singer would randomly pick one singer to perform next and vice versa.

Knockout (Ultimate Knockout Round)
Taping Date: March 17, 2016
Airdate: March 25, 2016
Yung and Lao were originally going to perform 4th and 6th, respectively, but swapped by mutual agreement due to Yung's leg injury. Portions of Leslie Cheung's lyrics during Chang's performance were unaired due to Cheung's death anniversary on April 1.

Overall ranking

 A. Three votes less than 3rd.
 B. Six votes less than 4th.

Breakout
Taping Date: March 24, 2016
Airdate: April 1, 2016
Four of the six singers who were initial singers (Hsu, Hwang, Coco and Hacken) were exempt from this round, while the other two singers participated along with previously eliminated singers for a chance to enter the finals. The performance order was determined based on the contestant's status quo and their duration on the stage. All but four singers went through ballot to decide the order, while Chang and Yung selected their performance freely, while unsuccessful challengers (Su and Kim) were defaulted to the first two performances.

The singers sang one song, and the three singers with the most votes qualified for the finals. Chang, Yung and Lao were the top three singers who received the highest number of votes and advanced to the finals. In a final tally, Lao, Wang, Shin, Kim and Su were revealed to have garnered 142, 134, 100, 99 and 98 votes, respectively. 

"我的天空", during Chang's performance as part of his medley, was edited out due to time constraints. This is currently the only episode to date in I Am a Singer where all participating contestants in the Breakout round doubled their roles as the hosts.

Final Round
Airdate: April 8, 2016

The finals were divided into two rounds, with the first song being a duet with a guest singer, and the second song being a solo encore performance. Similar to the previous season, only combined votes determined the season's winner.

First round
The first round of the finals was a guest singer's duet. The order was determined through balloting. The singer who received the lowest number of votes after the first round was eliminated from the competition.

Second round
The order of performance of this round was determined by the "First and Last" duel sequence based on the results of the first round, with the order being: 3rd, 4th, 2nd, 5th, 1st and 6th.

Overall results (Winner of Battle)
Before the final results were announced, the host named Chang, Hwang and Coco as the "Ultimate Winner Candidates". Coco was declared the winner with 53.29% of the votes, beating Chang's 25.75% and Hwang's 20.96% of the votes cast. The percentages reflected in the table counted only the votes of the three aforementioned singers.

Biennial Concert
Airdate: April 15, 2016
The concert featured singers from the third and fourth series, which include Han Hong, Li Jian, The One, Sitar Tan, Tiger Hu and A-Lin from Season 3, as well as Season 4 finalists Coco Lee, Jeff Chang, Hwang Chi Yeul, Hacken Lee, Joey Yung, LaLa Hsu and Lao Lang.

Ratings

|-
|1
|
|1.620
|7.41
|3
|1.00
|6.26
|2
|
|-
|2
|
|1.995
|
|2
|1.45
|
|1
|
|-
|3
|
|1.884
|9.06
|4
|1.13
|
|1
|
|-
|4
|
|2.271
|9.21
|1
|1.45
|7.23
|1
|
|-
|5
|
|1.891
|9.05
|3
|1.39
|7.30
|1
|CSM52 data do not have Lhasa data, then it is CSM51.
|-
|6
|
|2.003
|8.18
|4
|1.00
|5.95
|1
|
|-
|7
|
|1.863
|7.92
|4
|1.08
|6.24
|1
|
|-
|8
|
|2.015
|8.16
|3
|
|5.43
|1
|
|-
|9
|
|1.948
|8.43
|3
|1.00
|6.00
|1
|
|-
|10
|
|1.777
|7.19
|4
|
|5.34
|3
|
|-
|11
|
|1.935
|8.19
|4
|1.00
|5.94
|3
|
|-
|12
|
|1.690
|7.73
|4
|1.01
|6.20
|1
|
|-
|13
|
|
|7.89
|1
|
|5.86
|1
|This episode was in live-broadcast episode and began to 20:10 p.m. broadcast.
|-
|SP1
|
|
|
|3
|
|
|
|This episode was broadcast live.

External links
1. The entire series on YouTube

References

2016 Chinese television seasons
2016 in Chinese music
Singer (TV series)